Prenton is a suburb of Birkenhead, Wirral, Merseyside, England.  It contains seven buildings that are recorded in the National Heritage List for England as designated listed buildings, all of which are listed at Grade II.  This grade is the lowest of the three gradings given to listed buildings and is applied to "buildings of national importance and special interest".  Originally a rural area, since the 1920s it has been developed for residential use.  Four of the listed buildings are former farmhouses and farm buildings that have been adapted for other uses, and the others are a church and two war memorials.

See also
 Listed buildings in Noctorum (defined by postcode (only) as being in Prenton; otherwise within Birkenhead)

References

Citations

Sources

Listed buildings in Merseyside
Lists of listed buildings in Merseyside